The Praga Super Piccolo was a car produced by Praga in Czechoslovakia between 1934 and 1936.

Design
Launched at the 1934 Prague Motor Show, the Super Piccolo was designed as a mid-range replacement to the smaller Piccolo which would suit people who did not want the larger Alfa. Of conventional construction, with a rectangular frame chassis with X-shape stiffener, the car was initially produced as a four-door sedan only. This was joined by a small number of two-door Sidomka and Sodomkovy aerodynamic convertibles, but the biggest upheaval came at the 1935 Berlin Motor Show where Praga launched a distinctive aerodynamic sedan. The new model had a more curvilinear shape and covered front and rear wheels. The aerodynamic version was produced alongside the standard sedan.

Production
The vehicle was instantly popular and over 500 were sold in 1934. However, the price for the car high. The standard car cost 46,500 CSK in 1935, while the aerodynamic sedan was even more expensive at 46,500 CSK. The standard price was reduced to 40,800 CSK in summer 1936 and production ceased before the end of the year.

References

Cars introduced in 1934
Cars of the Czech Republic
Praga vehicles